Gérard Prunier (born 1942, in Paris
) is a French academic, historian, and consultant. He specializes in African history and affairs
—particularly the Horn of Africa and the African Great Lakes regions.

Biography
Prunier received a PhD in African History in 1981 from the University of Paris, spending a year at Harvard University and a stay in Caracas, Venezuela. In 1984, he joined the CNRS scientific institution in Paris as a researcher. He later also became Director of the French Centre for Ethiopian Studies in Addis Ababa.

Prunier has published over 120 articles and five books. He is fluent in his native French, as well as English and Spanish. He also has good knowledge of Italian and German, and a basic knowledge of Juba Arabic (Sudanese colloquial Arabic) and Swahili.

Published works
Books
  Les Ethnies ont une histoire (ed. with ), Paris : Karthala, 1989, 
  L'Ouganda et la question indienne : 1896-1972, Paris : Editions Recherche sur les civilisations, 1990
 The Rwanda Crisis: History of a Genocide, Columbia University Press, 1995, 
  Le Kenya contemporain, (ed. with François Grignon), Paris : Karthala & Nairobi : IFRA, 1998, 
 Darfur: The Ambiguous Genocide, Cornell University Press, 2005, 
  L'Éthiopie contemporaine (director), CFEE-Karthala, Addis Abeba and Paris, 2007, 
with Ficquet, Éloi. Understanding contemporary Ethiopia, L.: Oxford University Press, 2015 — english edition
 From Genocide to Continental War: The "Congolese" Conflict and the Crisis of Contemporary Africa, C. Hurst & Co., 2009, 
Published in the US as Africa’s World War: Congo, the Rwandan Genocide, and the Making of Continental Catastrophe, Oxford University Press, 2009, 
  Urgence Darfour with Morad El Hattab (direction), André Glucksmann, Bernard Kouchner, Bernard-Henri Lévy, Rossin Richard, Philippe Val, Paris: Des idées & des hommes, 2007
 The Country That Does Not Exist: A History of Somaliland — New York: Oxford University Press, 2021

Articles
 "Burundi: A Manageable Crisis?", WRITENET (UK), October 1994
 "Sudan’s regional war", Le Monde diplomatique, February 1997 
 "Rwanda: the Social, Political and Economic Situation", WRITENET (UK), June 1997
 "Somaliland, a forgotten country", Le Monde diplomatique, October 1997 
 "Uganda, nearly a miracle", Le Monde diplomatique, February 1998 
 "Somalia re-invents itself", Le Monde diplomatique, April 2000 
 "Sudan: irreconcilable differences, Le Monde diplomatique, December 2002 
 "Did Somebody Say Genocide?: Gérard Prunier on Darfur", Harper's Magazine, August 2006
 "Darfur's Sudan problem", OpenDemocracy.net, 15 September 2006
  The Ethio-Eritrean Conflict: An Essay in Interpretation
  Armed Movements in Sudan, Chad, CAR, Somalia Eritrea and Ethiopia 
 Somalia: Civil War, Intervention and Withdrawal 1990 - 1995 
From Fatigues to Three-Piece Suits: East African Guerrillas in Power
 Why did South Sudan blow up in December 2013 and what is likely to happen as a result?

References

External links
 Fergal Keane, Interview of Prunier on the Rwandan Genocide, PBS's Frontline (early 1997)
 Gerard Prunier on 'la francophonie' under threat  at Just World News blog with Helena Cobban, 31 May 2004
 
 Articles by Prunier  at openDemocracy

French scholars
People of the Rwandan genocide
People of the War in Darfur
University of Paris alumni
Historians of Africa
Living people
Historians of Kenya
1942 births